Takovikha is a rural locality (a village) in Volosatovskoye Rural Settlement, Selivanovsky District, Vladimir Oblast, Russia. The population was 3 as of 2010.
date=2014-07-21 }}. </ref>

Geography 
Takovikha is located 32 km north of Krasnaya Gorbatka (the district's administrative centre) by road. Shevinskaya is the nearest rural locality.

References 

Rural localities in Selivanovsky District